La Nena de Argentina is the second studio album by Argentine singer María Becerra. It was released on 8 December 2022 through 300 Entertainment.

La Nena de Argentina was supported by four singles: "Ojalá", released on 1 June 2022; "Automático", released on 8 September 2022; it's title track of the same name released on the same day as the album's release, and "Desafiando el Destino" released on 12 January 2023.

Background
After the release of her debut album, Animal, in 2021, Becerra released "Felices x Siempre" on 2 February 2022. On 29 April 2022, Becerra revealed via Twitter that her second studio album would be titled La Nena de Argentina, as well as confirming "Felices x Siempre" as the lead single. Becerra began teasing that the majority of the album would be without any collaborations. On 1 June 2022, "Ojalá" was released as the next single. Becerra teased "Automático" as the next single from her album via TikTok on July and would officially release it on 8 September 2022. Later that same month, Becerra confirmed the exclusion of "Felices x Siempre" from the album, revealed that the album would count with no collaborations, and that there would be 12-14 tracks present. On 28 November, the official cover art for La Nena de Argentina was released. The tracklist for the album was teased each day on Becerra's social media's up until the 5th of December when the complete tracklist was revealed. The album was officially released on 8 December 2022.

Conception
María Becerra on the importance of the name “La Nena de Argentina”: “It represents many important things for me, above all, the representation of my country and that is what fulfills me the most. […] Suddenly I see posts like ‘how nice what our girl from Argentina is achieving’. People identify me as a part of the country, I think that is very nice, it is a very beautiful representation. I carry that flag with great pride and much respect.

Previous to her debut album, Becerra didn’t search for a specific concept, rather her as a whole, she stated: “I wanted it to be me, María, the girl from Argentina. This is reflected on how I love making music, and how I’m fascinated by all genres. These songs showcases my two facets, the wildest side, of sexual tension and seduction, and my sensitive side, emotional and dramatic.” 

The singer also revealed on why her desire to release an album with no collaborators: “In a world full of collaborations, it is risky to put out a completely solo album but since it is so personal, I felt that it should be a story that I tell by myself”.

Promotion

Singles
"Ojalá" was released on 1 June 2022 as the lead single from the album. The track would peak inside the top 2 in Argentina and top 10 in Uruguay. "Automático" was released on 8 September 2022 as the second single from the album. It peaked inside the top 5 in Argentina at number 4 and inside the top 20 of Spain. "La Nena de Argentina" was released on 8 December 2022 as the third single from the album, the same day as the album's release. It peaked inside the top 25 in Argentina. "Desafiando el Destino" was released on 12 January 2023 as the fourth single in the reissue of the album. The song peaked inside the top 70 in Argentina.

Other songs

"Felices x Siempre" was released on 2 February 2022 and was intended as the lead single from the album, but was eventually scrapped from the final tracklist.

Live stream
On 15 December 2022 Becerra did a 7 hour live stream via YouTube, Twitch, TikTok and Instagram where she promoted the album’s release by having special guests including Nico Cotton and Xross, main producers of La Nena de Argentina. She revealed the behind the scenes for each track, danced through various challenges and more.

Track listing

Charts

Release history

References

2022 albums
María Becerra albums
Spanish-language albums